= Integrated Index for Postal Development =

The Integrated Index for Postal Development (2IPD) is a scale confected by the Universal Postal Union to measure "a composite index providing an overview of postal development around the world".

2IPD covered the postal services for 170 countries in 2016. It covered 172 countries in 2022.

The measure "takes into consideration four main factors: quality of service performance; global postal connectedness; level of competitiveness in local and international markets; and ability to show resilience." "The 2IPD draws on three main types of UPU data: postal big data, statistics and surveys."

== See also ==
Postal Development Indicator
